Alexander Magnus Karlsson, known professionally as Alex Karlsson, is a Swedish–American songwriter, producer, and singer. He has worked on K-Pop songs such as AleXa's "Bomb" (2019), BTS’s "We Are Bulletproof : The Eternal" (2020), Super M’s "Tiger Inside" (2020), Enhypen’s "Fever" (2021), and TXT‘s "Loser=Lover" (2021).

Discography 
Featuring artist

 2022 – "Heart's On Fire" IMLAY feat. Alex Karlsson
 2018 – "Holy Water" Navarra feat. Alex Karlsson

References 

Living people
Swedish record producers
Swedish songwriters
Year of birth missing (living people)